Harry Eugene Grabosky (September 1, 1936 – May 4, 2001) was an American collegiate and professional football defensive tackle. He played professionally in the American Football League for the Buffalo Bills. He played college football at Syracuse University and was drafted in the 26th round of the 1959 NFL Draft by the Washington Redskins.

References

See also
 List of American Football League players

1936 births
2001 deaths
American football defensive tackles
Buffalo Bills players
Players of American football from Syracuse, New York
Syracuse Orange football players
American Football League players
Liverpool High School alumni